The Georgia Department of Public Safety (GDPS) is a state body that is responsible for statewide law enforcement and public safety within the U.S. state of Georgia. The current Commissioner of the department is Chris C. Wright, who is also Colonel of the Georgia State Patrol.

Divisions
On February 28, 1974, the Georgia Bureau of Investigation (GBI) was made an independent agency separate from the Georgia Department of Public Safety.

Georgia State Patrol

The Georgia State Patrol is the highway patrol agency for the U.S. state of Georgia, which has jurisdiction anywhere in the state. GSP Troopers primarily operate on the long stretches of Interstate highway as well as providing SWAT team response to rural areas of the state.

A lieutenant colonel serves as commanding officer over field operations; the current Lieutenant Colonel is William W. Hitchens, III.

Georgia Capitol Police
Georgia Capitol Police is one of the divisions of the Georgia Department of Public Safety responsible for law enforcement of the Capitol Hill area of Atlanta, Georgia. A Captain serves as Director of Georgia Capitol Police; The current Captain is James D. Wicker. 

The Division is split into two units:

 Capitol Police Services Unit
 Capitol Square Security Unit

Georgia Motor Carrier Compliance Division
The Motor Carrier Compliance Division is responsible for the enforcement of the laws and rules of the Federal Motor Carrier Safety Administration.  This division conducts safety inspections of commercial motor vehicles especially buses and trucks, inspects highway shipments of hazardous materials, and performs compliance reviews (aka safety performance audits) on motor carriers. It also enforces laws and regulations that govern vehicle size (height, width, and length) and weight. It operates the 19 weigh stations in the state of Georgia and also performs roadside inspections on Commercial Motor Vehicles.  Lastly the MCCD also enforces the High Occupancy Vehicle (HOV) lanes through the city of Atlanta.

See also

 List of law enforcement agencies in Georgia
 Georgia Bureau of Investigation
 State police
 State patrol
 Highway patrol

References

External links
 Georgia Dept. of Public Safety
 Georgia Capitol Police
 Georgia Motor Carrier Compliance Division

State law enforcement agencies of Georgia (U.S. state)
Government agencies established in 1937
1937 establishments in Georgia (U.S. state)